Michael Vincent Hechinger (February 14, 1890 – August 13, 1967) was a professional baseball player who played catcher from 1912 to 1913.

External links

1890 births
1967 deaths
Major League Baseball catchers
Brooklyn Superbas players
Chicago Cubs players
Newark Indians players
Harrisburg Senators players
Baseball players from Chicago